Gilberto Almeida Egas (30 May 1928 – 20 April 2015) was an Ecuadorian painter born in San Antonio de Ibarra, in Imbabura Province. He studied at the School of Fine Arts in Quito from 1953 to 1957. His early work was in many media, especially paintings of buildings and views in old Quito; his later work concentrated on large black-and-white drawings, in a baroque, expressionistic, and dramatic style.

He has exhibited in major Ecuadoran cities including Quito, Guayaquil, and Cuenca. In 1963 he was invited to exhibit in Chile, and he subsequently exhibited in Buenos Aires, Argentina, at the Galería de la Asociación de Artistas Plásticos. In 1969 he exhibited at the museum of the Pan American Union in Washington, D.C.

Works by Almeida are included in the collections of museums and galleries in Sweden, Argentina, Chile, Mexico, Venezuela, Israel, Australia, the United States, and Canada in addition to Ecuador, and in major private collections.

He died on 20 April 2015.

Honours and awards

Invitational exhibitions
1963 Invited exhibitor, Third São Paulo Art Biennial
1963 Guest of honor, spring salon, Mendosa, Argentina
1965 Guest of honor, spring salon, Viña del Mar, Chile
1967 Invited exhibitor, Cali Biennial, Colombia
1969 Invited exhibitor, Colteger Biennial, Medellín, Colombia
1970 Invited exhibitor, Inter-American Development Bank, Washington DC
1985 Nominated as Artist of the Year, Asociación de Periodistas (Press Association)
1993 Nominated for Premio Eugenio Espejo
1996 Invited exhibitor at the trimillennial celebration of the city of Jerusalem, Israel
1998 Homage to the artists of De Vanguardia, Casa de la Cultura Ecuatoriana, Quito
2000 Exhibition in Lima, Peru, at the invitation of the Ecuadorian Embassy
2001 Invitational exhibition in Australia

Awards
First prize, V Bolivarian Games
First prize, Casa de la Cultura Núcleo Azuay
First prize, fiesta de las frutas y de las flores Ambato
Third prize, Mariano Aguilera Award, Quito
Second prize, July salon, Guayaquil
First prize, October exhibition (Guayaquil, 1959)
Second prize, Bolivarian salon, Guayaquil
First prize, mural project
First prize for culture of the Ministry of Public Works
First prize, Mariano Aguilera Award, (Quito, 1964)
First prize, July salon, Guayaquil
Second prize, International independence salon, Quito
First prize, National Salon of the Plastic Arts, Quito
First prize of the national exhibition in the House of Culture, (Quito, 1976)
Second prize, Banco Central del Ecuador National Arts Awards, Quito
First prize International Biennial, Cuenca, critics' choice

Honours
21 February 2002: Order of Merit, Official Grade, conferred by President Gustavo Noboa Bejarano 
4 June 2003: Doctor Vicente Rocafuerte Award of the National Congress of Ecuador, conferred by its president, Guillermo Landázuri Carrillo
June 2003: Award of Artistic Merit, San Antonio de Ibarra  
June 2003: Award from the Council of the Province of Imbabura
June 2003: Award of Artistic Merit, Casa de la Cultura Núcleo, Carchi.
September 2006 Homage and recognition of lifetime artistic achievement on the occasional of the celebration of the 400th anniversary of the Spanish foundation of the city of Ibarra
September 2006: Homage and recognition of lifetime artistic achievement, Instituto Superior Tecnológico de Artes Plásticas "Daniel Reyes"

Bibliography

Palabra e Imagen año 1999 – Marco Antonio Rodríguez.
Artistas Plásticos del Ecuador año 2002 – Ministerio de Relaciones Exteriores.
Grandes del Siglo Veinte año 2002 - Marco Antonio Rodríguez.

References
Notes

References

1928 births
2015 deaths
People from Ibarra, Ecuador
20th-century Ecuadorian painters
21st-century Ecuadorian painters